The 1980 AIAW National Division I Basketball Championship was held on March 12–23, 1980.  Twenty-four teams were invited, with eight teams receiving first round byes.  First round games were played at on-campus locations.  Old Dominion University was crowned national champion at the conclusion of the tournament, for the second straight season.  The championship game was broadcast live on NBC.

The host site for the Final Four was Central Michigan University in Mount Pleasant, Michigan.

Opening rounds

East Regional

Central Regional

South Regional

West Regional

Final Four – Mount Pleasant, MI

See also
1980 AIAW National Division II Basketball Championship
1980 AIAW National Division III Basketball Championship

References

AIAW women's basketball tournament
AIAW
AIAW National Division I Basketball Championship
1980 in sports in Michigan
Women's sports in Michigan